Caloptilia infaceta is a moth of the family Gracillariidae. It is known from Madagascar.

References

infaceta
Moths of Madagascar
Moths described in 1987